is a Japanese professional baseball pitcher for the Yomiuri Giants.

References 

1994 births
Living people
Baseball people from Osaka Prefecture
Tokai University alumni
Japanese baseball players
Nippon Professional Baseball pitchers
Yomiuri Giants players
2019 WBSC Premier12 players